Ancylolomia chrysargyria is a moth in the family Crambidae. It was described by George Hampson in 1919. It is found in the Democratic Republic of the Congo, Ghana and Nigeria.

References

Ancylolomia
Moths described in 1919
Moths of Africa